Charles Blades (4 September 1883 – 25 November 1914) was a Barbadian cricketer. He played in two first-class matches for the Barbados cricket team in 1905/06.

See also
 List of Barbadian representative cricketers

References

External links
 

1883 births
1914 deaths
Barbadian cricketers
Barbados cricketers
People from Saint Philip, Barbados
Barbadian emigrants to the United States